Saitbayevo (Säyetbay) is a rural locality (a village) in Kainlykovsky Selsoviet, Burayevsky District, Bashkortostan, Russia. The population was 282 as of 2010. There are 3 streets.

Geography 
Saitbayevo is located 21 km southwest of Burayevo (the district's administrative centre) by road. Kainlykovo is the nearest rural locality.

References 

Rural localities in Burayevsky District